Antonio de Almeida  (20 January 1928 – 18 February 1997) was a French conductor and musicologist of Portuguese-American descent.

Born Antonio Jacques de Almeida Santos in Neuilly-sur-Seine near Paris, his father was the financier Baron de Almeida Santos of Lisbon, his mother was the former Barbara Tapper of Highland Park near Chicago. His godfather was pianist Arthur Rubinstein.

Early years

De Almeida was born in Neuilly-sur-Seine. As a child he studied piano, showing great musical talent (although he admitted he was not an exceptional pianist).  In the early 1940s, he taught himself to play the clarinet by listening to recordings of Benny Goodman and Artie Shaw.  When his family moved to Buenos Aires he studied with Alberto Ginastera, and he had the opportunity to hear performances conducted by notable European refugees at the Teatro Colón.  He studied nuclear chemistry at the Massachusetts Institute of Technology.  Leading a student orchestra there, he realized he was more interested in music than in science.  His godfather, pianist Artur Rubinstein, convinced him to give up his full scholarship at M.I.T.  He attended Yale University, where he studied musical theory with Paul Hindemith. He received his Bachelor of Music degree at Yale in 1949.  He took conducting courses with Sergei Koussevitzky and Leonard Bernstein at the Tanglewood Music Center, and also studied conducting with George Szell. During his student days, he played first horn at Tufts College, first bassoon at Harvard, oboe with the Wellesley Orchestra, clarinet at MIT and the cello at Yale.

Conducting

He began conducting for Portuguese Radio in Lisbon in 1949, and soon after was appointed to his first conducting post at the Oporto Symphony Orchestra.  While there, he invited Thomas Beecham to guest conduct the orchestra.  He was the conductor of the Portuguese Radio in Lisbon (1957–1960) and Stuttgart Philharmonic (1962–1964).  He gave the Paris premiere of Il Trittico at the Opéra-Comique in 1964, and worked at the Opéra National de Paris from 1965 to 1967.  He was principal guest conductor of the Houston Symphony (1969–1971) and then music director of the Orchestre philharmonique de Nice (1971–1978).  He gave the Argentinian premiere of Mahler's 7th Symphony in Buenos Aires. He became the music director of the Moscow Symphony Orchestra in 1993, a position he held at his death.

His American debut came in November 1960 with the opening of the eighth subscription season of New York's American Opera Society at The Town Hall.  He led the Symphony of the Air in a concert version of Christoph Willibald Gluck's Orfeo ed Euridice.  New York Times reviewer Harold C. Schonberg wrote of the conductor "He knows his business.  Cool, not flamboyant of gesture, capable, he held the performance together as nicely as one would desire".  He also wrote that "Mr. de Almeida is a conductor to watch".

Recording

He made numerous recordings, specializing in French operas such as Ambroise Thomas' Mignon and Hamlet, and Fromental Halévy's La Juive.  His recordings were instrumental in restoring compositions of Ernest Chausson, Henri Duparc, Florent Schmitt and Jules Massenet to the active repertory.  He recorded ballet music from the operas of Gaetano Donizetti, Gioachino Rossini, and Giuseppe Verdi.  With the Moscow Symphony he recorded orchestral works of, among others, Charles Tournemire, Henri Sauguet, and Gian Francesco Malipiero.  He recorded for many labels, including Columbia, EMI, Erato, Naxos, Philips, RCA and Supraphon.

Musicology

An interest in the works of Jacques Offenbach began in the 1950s, and by the 1970s Almeida was known as an authority.  He made numerous discoveries including previously unknown arias and a second-act finale for La Grande-Duchesse de Gérolstein. He prepared editions of Offenbach's operas, and compiled a Thematic Catalogue of the Works of Jacques Offenbach.

He became co-artistic director (with H.C. Robbins Landon) of the Haydn Foundation in 1968.  Under the Foundation's auspices, he recorded a set of Joseph Haydn's symphonies.  He also edited a complete set of Luigi Boccherini's symphonies for Doblinger in Vienna.

Personal life

He was married to Lynn Erdman in 1953, their marriage ending in divorce in 1988.  The couple had two sons (Antonio de Almeida Santos and Lawrence d'Almeida) and a daughter (Cecilia de Almeida Frachesen).  His son Antonio, a Juilliard and Academy of Vocal Arts trained opera singer, worked as classical record producer and served as a producer and engineer for some of the conductor's Moscow Symphony recordings.

Despite his Portuguese/American parentage, he declared his nationality to be French, and he remained a citizen of France throughout his life.  He spoke six languages fluently, and was well versed in Greek and Latin.

He died of liver and lung cancer on 18 February 1997, age 69, at the University of Pittsburgh Medical Center.

Selected discography 
 Canteloube: Chants d'Auvergne, Vol. 1, with Frederica von Stade and the Royal Philharmonic Orchestra, CBS Masterworks, 1982
 Canteloube: Chants d'Auvergne, Vol. 2 & Triptyque, with Frederica von Stade and the Royal Philharmonic Orchestra, CBS Masterworks, 1986
 Offenbach: Arias and Overtures, with Frederica von Stade and the Scottish Chamber Orchestra, RCA Victor Red Seal, 1995
 Mignon, with André Battedou, Paul Hudson, Marilyn Horne, Claude Méloni, Frederica von Stade, Alain Vanzo, Ruth Welting, Nicola Zaccaria, the Ambrosian Opera Chorus and the Philharmonia Orchestra, CBS Masterworks, 1978

Awards
 Légion d'honneur, Chevalier (1976) and later Commandeur (1996)
 Ordre des Arts et des Lettres, Commandeur (1990)

References

 "Antonio de Almeida, Head of the Moscow Symphony" Cleveland Plain Dealer, February 24, 1997, page 6B.
 Baker's Biographical Dictionary of Musicians (2001)
 Hughes, Allen "Houston Symphony Names a 39-Year-Old Conductor".  New York Times, May 16, 1969, page 37.
 Kozinn, Allan.  "Antonio de Almeida, Conductor and Offenbach's Champion, 69", New York Times, February 21, 1997.
 New Grove Dictionary of Opera, 1992.
 Schonberg, Harold C. "Opera: Gluck's Orfeo".  New York Times, November 2, 1960, page 43.

1928 births
1997 deaths
French male conductors (music)
20th-century French conductors (music)
20th-century French musicologists
People from Neuilly-sur-Seine
French people of Portuguese descent
French people of American descent
Deaths from lung cancer in Pennsylvania
Commandeurs of the Légion d'honneur
Commandeurs of the Ordre des Arts et des Lettres
Deaths from liver cancer
20th-century French male musicians